Walnut Hill station is a DART Light Rail station in Dallas, Texas. It serves DART's Red and Orange Lines and is located in North Dallas at Walnut Hill Lane and Manderville Lane, just east of US 75 (North Central Expressway). It is the second of four elevated stations on the DART that opened on July 1, 2002, and it serves nearby residential and shopping areas of Lake Highlands, as well as Presbyterian Hospital of Dallas.

External links
 DART - Walnut Hill Station

Dallas Area Rapid Transit light rail stations in Dallas
Railway stations in the United States opened in 2002
2002 establishments in Texas
Railway stations in Dallas County, Texas